Sören Claeson (born 1959) is a Swedish wrestler. He was born in Lidköping. He won an Olympic bronze medal in Greco-Roman wrestling in 1984, and also competed at the 1980 and 1988 Olympics.

References

External links
 

1959 births
Living people
People from Lidköping Municipality
Olympic wrestlers of Sweden
Wrestlers at the 1980 Summer Olympics
Wrestlers at the 1984 Summer Olympics
Wrestlers at the 1988 Summer Olympics
Swedish male sport wrestlers
Olympic bronze medalists for Sweden
Olympic medalists in wrestling
Medalists at the 1984 Summer Olympics
Sportspeople from Västra Götaland County
20th-century Swedish people
21st-century Swedish people